Drobin  is a town in Płock County, Masovian Voivodeship, Poland, with 2,778 inhabitants as of December 2021.

History
The settlement was first mentioned in the 12th century, when it was part of Piast-ruled Poland. It was granted town rights in 1511 under the Jagiellonian dynasty. It was a private town of Polish nobility, administratively located in the Płock Voivodeship in the Greater Poland Province of the Polish Crown.

In 1869 Drobin lost its town status. It was regained in 1994.

A battle was fought nearby on August 15, 1920, during the Polish-Soviet War.

During the German occupation of Poland (World War II), the Germans renamed the town Reichenfeld to erase traces of Polish origin, and operated a forced labour camp there.

Sports
The local football team is Skra Drobin. It competes in the lower leagues.

References

External links
 Official site of Drobin (in Polish)
 Jewish Community in Drobin on Virtual Shtetl

Cities and towns in Masovian Voivodeship
Płock County
Płock Governorate
Warsaw Voivodeship (1919–1939)